Pavel Syarheyevich Plaskonny (born 29 January 1985) is a retired Belarusian footballer who played defender.

Club career
In July 2010, he signed with Neman Grodno. In early December 2011, Plaskonny moved to Dinamo Minsk, putting pen to paper on a three-year contract.

34-year old Plaskonny announced his retirement in September 2019.

Honours
Shakhtyor Soligorsk
Belarusian Premier League champion: 2005

International career
Plaskonny has appeared 12 times for the senior Belarus national football team, his first call up coming in November 2005.

International goal

References

External links
 
 
 

1985 births
Living people
Belarusian footballers
Association football defenders
Belarus international footballers
Belarusian expatriate footballers
Expatriate footballers in Russia
Expatriate footballers in Greece
Expatriate footballers in Kazakhstan
Belarusian expatriate sportspeople in Russia
FC Lokomotiv Moscow players
FC Shakhtyor Soligorsk players
Panionios F.C. players
FC Neman Grodno players
FC Dinamo Minsk players
FC Atyrau players
FC Vitebsk players
FC Belshina Bobruisk players
FC Gorodeya players
FC Krumkachy Minsk players